Gao Xiang may refer to:

Gao Xiang (Three Kingdoms) ( 217–240s), general of Shu Han during the Three Kingdoms period
Gao Xiang (painter) (1688–1753), Qing dynasty painter
Gao Xiang (footballer) (born 1989), Chinese footballer
Xiang Gao, Chinese violinist
Gao Xiang (historian) (born 1963), Chinese historian and politician